Strandbuen is a local newspaper published in Strand, Norway. It was established in 1964.

It has a circulation of 4,354, of whom 3,895 are subscribers.

Strandbuen is published by Strandbuen AS, which is owned 100% by Jærbladet AS, which is owned 33.3% by Dalane Tidende & Egersund Avis AS and two other agents.

References
Norwegian Media Registry

External links
Website

1964 establishments in Norway
Publications established in 1964
Newspapers published in Norway
Mass media in Rogaland
Strand, Norway